Softball at the 2011 Pan American Games in Guadalajara were held in between October 17 and 23. All games were played at the Pan American Softball Stadium. Pan American softball is competed by women only, while men compete in the similar sport of baseball. Each team can enter a team of 17 athletes for a maximum of 136 competitors for this tournament.

The United States were the defending champions from the 2007 Pan American Games in Rio de Janeiro.

On October 23, the United States defeated Canada to win its seventh straight gold medal.

Medal summary

Medal table

Medalists

Schedule
The competition will be spread out across seven days.

Teams

Qualification
The top 7 teams from the 2009 Pan American Championship and hosts Mexico qualified teams for the tournament.

Participants

Competition format
Eight teams compete in the Pan American softball tournament, and the competition consists of two rounds.  The preliminary round follows a round robin format, where each of the teams plays all the other teams once.  Following this, the top four teams advance to a page playoff system round consisting of two semifinal games, and finally the bronze and gold medal games.

Preliminary round

Schedule

Medal Round
The loser of 1&2 seed game will play the winner of the 3&4 seed game in the bronze-medal match. The loser of the bronze-medal match wins the bronze medal while the winner goes on to play the winner of the 1&2 seed game for the gold medal in the gold-medal match.

Semifinals

Bronze-medal match

Gold-medal match

Final standings

References 

 
Softball at the Pan American Games
2011 in softball
International softball competitions hosted by Mexico